Model Y may refer to:

 Ford Model Y, an automobile produced from 1932 to 1937
 Gee Bee Senior Sportster (also the Model Y), a sports aircraft built in the United States in the early 1930s
 Stearman-Hammond Y-1 (originally the Hammond Model Y), a 1930s American utility monoplane
 Tesla Model Y, an electric compact crossover utility vehicle

See also
 Y (disambiguation)
 Y class (disambiguation)